B & H Tool Works, Inc. is a large tool and die company specializing in the design, build, and repair of Class "A" Progressive Dies.  The company is headquartered in Richmond, Kentucky and was established in 1978 by Sammy Hammons and Tommy Brown.  A second facility is located in Mount Vernon, Kentucky.

At the Richmond facility, capabilities include CNC machining, Wire EDM, and 5-Axis laser cutting services.  Equipment used includes two CNC Vertical Machining Centers, one Mazak Turning Center, four Wire EDM Centers, and one Prima 5-Axis Laser.  Recently the company upgraded one of its older CNC mills to a Kitamura MyCenter-7X and added an Agiecut Classic Gold 3S Wire EDM Center.  The Laser Department includes 2 100-Ton press brakes used to form and bend lasercut parts.

Besides tool and die, B & H Tool Works also runs production of metal stampings for several industries, the largest being automotive.  The company serves as a Tier 2 supplier to several large automobile manufacturers for metal stampings and tooling.

B&H now has 5 wire EDM machines and a total of 15 stamping presses.  Recent construction has also added an additional  of manufacturing and office space.

External links
 

Tool manufacturing companies of the United States
Manufacturing companies based in Kentucky
Manufacturing companies established in 1978
1978 establishments in Kentucky
Richmond, Kentucky